1961 in philosophy

Events 
Hegel Yearbook was established in 1961.

Publications 
 Arnold J. Toynbee, A Study of History (1961)
 Emmanuel Lévinas, Totality and Infinity (1961)
 H. L. A. Hart, The Concept of Law (1961)
 Frantz Fanon, The Wretched of the Earth (1961)
 E. H. Carr, What Is History? (1961)

Philosophical fiction 
 Stanisław Lem, Solaris (1961)

Births

Deaths 
 January 4 - Erwin Schrödinger (born 1887)
 May 3 - Maurice Merleau-Ponty (born 1908)  
 May 6 - Lucian Blaga (born 1895)
 June 6 - Carl Jung (born 1875)
 December 6 - Frantz Fanon (born 1925)

References

See also 

Philosophy
20th-century philosophy
Philosophy by year